Dancing Queen is a 2012 South Korean romantic comedy film starring Uhm Jung-hwa and Hwang Jung-min. The film tells a story of a married couple, who in the midst of their mundane lives decides to pursue their lost dreams. The husband finds himself accidentally running for Mayor of Seoul and his wife decides to become a pop singer. It was produced by JK Film and distributed by CJ Entertainment, and released on January 18, 2012.

Plot
Uhm Jung-Hwa dreamed about becoming a singer when she was young but had to put her dream aside when she married Hwang Jung-min. Although Hwang is a lawyer, he is always worrying about paying the rent.

One day, Hwang rescues a drunk man who falls off of a subway platform and becomes an instant hero. His heroic act pushes him into the political arena and he decides to run for Seoul mayor. Things go along just fine until Uhm receives a once-in-a-lifetime opportunity to sign with an entertainment agency, forcing her to choose between her dream and his. It's not long before she realizes that she can't give up her dream and she decides to pursue both.

The film demonstrates that age is just a number and that dreams can come true.

Cast
 Uhm Jung-hwa – Herself
 Hwang Jung-min – Himself
 Jung Sung-hwa – Jong-chan
 Lee Han-wi – Han-wi
 Ra Mi-ran – Myung-ae
 Oh Na-ra – Ra-ri
 Choi Woo-ri – Rinda
 Ah-Rong – Eve
 Lee Dae-yeon – Pil-je
 Jeong Gyu-su – Myung-goo
 Seo Dong-won – Jung-chul
 Park Sa-rang – Yeon-woo
 Lee A-rin – Dorothy
 Yeo Moo-young – Political party leader
 Seong Byeong-suk – Jung-hwa's mother
 Song Jae-ho – Jung-hwa's father
 Chun Bo-geun – young Jung-min
 Kim Young-sun – Jung-min's mother (flashback)
 Ma Dong-seok – Gay couple (cameo)
 Jo Dal-hwan – Manager (cameo)
 Lee Hyori – Judge of Superstar K (cameo)
 Son Hee-soon – Jung-hwa's Aunt
 Tae In-ho - Assistant director

Production
This is the third collaboration of singer-actress Uhm Jung-hwa and actor Hwang Jung-min. They burned up the screen in the 2005 hit All for Love, with Uhm playing a stuck-up divorced doctor and Hwang playing a foul-mouthed detective; the chemistry between the two boosted ticket sales back then. They again starred together in Five Senses of Eros.

Reception
The film is lauded for reflecting social issues, as The Korea Times in its review said "What makes the film interesting is that it opts to examine the psychology behind the precarious situation, when a couple’s individual interest is at odds with the other". While The Hollywood Reporter quoted "Dancing Queen is polished entertainment with a subtle message, anchored by an engaging (if physically awkward) performances and a suitably pulsating empowerment anthem".

According to data provided by Korean Film Council (KOFIC) it was the second most-watched film in South Korea in the first quarter of 2012, with a total of 4 million admissions. It ranked first and grossed  in its first week of release and grossed a total of  after seven weeks of screening.

References

External links
  
 
 

2012 films
2012 romantic comedy films
South Korean romantic comedy films
Films directed by Lee Seok-hoon
CJ Entertainment films
2010s Korean-language films
2010s South Korean films